John Patrick was a Scottish professional golfer. Patrick placed tied for seventh in the 1895 U.S. Open, held on Friday, 4 October, at Newport Golf Club in Newport, Rhode Island. Horace Rawlins won the inaugural U.S. Open title, two strokes ahead of runner-up Willie Dunn.

References

Scottish male golfers
Scottish emigrants to the United States